The Banned Woman is a 1997 French drama film directed by Philippe Harel. It was entered into the 1997 Cannes Film Festival.

Cast
 Isabelle Carré – Elle (Muriel)
 Philippe Harel – Moi (François)
 Nathalie Conio – My secretary
 Sophie Niedergang – My wife
 Julien Niedergang – My son
 Zinedine Soualem – The ticket's man

References

External links

1997 films
French drama films
Films about obsessive–compulsive disorder
1990s French-language films
1997 drama films
Films directed by Philippe Harel
1990s French films